By a Thread or Hanging By a Thread or variants may refer to:

Film and TV
Hanging by a Thread (1979 film)
Sister Street Fighter: Hanging by a Thread Japanese martial arts film

Albums
By a Thread (Gov't Mule album)
By a Thread – Live in London 2011 Devin Townsend live album
By a Thread, album by John Ellis (saxophonist)
Hanging On By a Thread album by The Letter Black

Songs
"Hanging by a Thread", song by Nickelback (Gordon Kennedy, Wayne Kirkpatrick) from the album This Side
"Hanging by a Thread", song by Elk Road featuring Natalie Foster (2016).
"Hangin' On by a Thread (A Sad Affair of the Heart)", song by Kim Carnes, written Carnes, from Checkin' Out the Ghosts
"Hangin' On By A Thread", song by Farquahr, written  Farquahr & Ragavoy 1971
"Hanging On By A Thread", song by Smokey Robinson W. "Smokey" Robinson, M. Davis 1988
"Hangin' On By A Thread", song by Texas Tornados, written  Doug Sahm	 	1992
"Hangin' On By A Thread", song by rapper Madchild
"Hanging By A Thread", song by Mike and The Mechanics, written Mike Rutherford	1986
"Hanging By A Thread", song by Thanksgiving (band)  	 	1971